Gov. Charles C. Stratton House is located in Woolwich Township, Gloucester County, New Jersey, United States. The house was built in 1791 and was added to the National Register of Historic Places on January 29, 1973. The house was the home of New Jersey Governor Charles C. Stratton.

See also
National Register of Historic Places listings in Gloucester County, New Jersey

References

Federal architecture in New Jersey
Houses on the National Register of Historic Places in New Jersey
Houses completed in 1791
Houses in Gloucester County, New Jersey
National Register of Historic Places in Gloucester County, New Jersey
New Jersey Register of Historic Places
1791 establishments in New Jersey
Woolwich Township, New Jersey
Governor of New Jersey